The Confederate Monument, in the city cemetery of Versailles, Kentucky, was placed on the National Register of Historic Places on July 17, 1997, as part of the Civil War Monuments of Kentucky MPS.

The monument, with it unique shape, was made of white marble and put on a base of concrete and limestone.  It was erected in 1877.  Names of Confederate veterans are on each side of the hexagon, with graves encircling it.

Gallery

References

Civil War Monuments of Kentucky MPS
National Register of Historic Places in Woodford County, Kentucky
Confederate States of America monuments and memorials in Kentucky
1877 sculptures
Marble sculptures in Kentucky
Concrete sculptures in Kentucky
Limestone sculptures in Kentucky
1877 establishments in Kentucky
Versailles, Kentucky